The 1955–56 season of the Belgian First Division was won by R.S.C. Anderlecht.

Overview

It was contested by 16 teams, and R.S.C. Anderlecht won the championship.

League standings

Results

References

Belgian Pro League seasons
1955–56 in Belgian football
Belgian